Pro Patria Finlandia is Impaled Nazarene's ninth full-length studio album. It was released on Osmose Productions in 2006.

Track listing 
All songs written and arranged by Impaled Nazarene.
 Weapons to Tame a Land – 3:53
 Something Sinister – 2:53
 Goat Sodomy – 2:22
 Neighbouricide – 3:39
 One Dead Nation Under Dead God – 3:48
 For Those Who Have Fallen – 3:43
 Leucorrhea – 0:43
 Kut – 2:47
 This Castrated World – 3:16
 Psykosis – 3:15
 Contempt – 1:37
 I Wage War – 2:11
 Cancer – 0:56
 Hate-Despise-Arrogance – 3:04

Personnel
Mika Luttinen (Sluti666) – vocals
Tuomio Louhio – lead guitar
Jarno Anttila (Onraj 9mm) – rhythm guitar
Mikael Arnkil (Arc V 666) –  bass
Reima Kellokoski (Repe Misanthrope) – drums

Production
Tapio Pennanen – production, recording, engineering, mixing
Impaled Nazarene – production
Mika Jussila – mastering

2006 albums
Impaled Nazarene albums
Osmose Productions albums